The First Oklahoma Legislature was the first meeting of the legislative branch of the government of Oklahoma, composed of the Oklahoma Senate and the Oklahoma House of Representatives. The meeting took place from December 2, 1907, to May 26, 1908, in the Guthrie City Hall Building during the first year of the only term of Governor Charles Haskell.

Both houses of the state legislature had large Democratic majorities. William H. Murray, who had served as the president of the state constitutional convention, was elected by his colleagues as the first Speaker of the Oklahoma House of Representatives. Henry S. Johnston, who had served as the presiding officer of the state constitutional convention, was elected to serve as the first President pro tempore of the Oklahoma Senate.

Dates of session
Regular session: December 2, 1907 – May 26, 1908
Next: 2nd Legislature

Major legislation
Prohibition - State Senator Richard Billups authored legislation to prohibit the manufacture, transportation and possession of liquor. The bill was amended by William H. Murray to allow state liquor dispensaries for medicinal and scientific purposes. It was signed by the governor on March 24, 1908.
Segregation / Jim Crow - The very first bill introduced in both houses once statehood had been achieved was a measure requiring separate coaches and waiting rooms for white and black persons. Oklahoma was admitted to the Union on Saturday, November 16, 1907. The legislature convened two weeks later on Monday December 2. After formalities on the first day, both the House and Senate introduced respective Bill No. 1 on the second legislative day in each chamber, entitled: "An Act for the accommodation, comfort, convenience and protection of passengers on Railroad Trains and Cars." (House) and  “An Act to promote the comfort of passengers on railroads, street cars, urban, interurban, suburban cars, and at railroad stations.” (Senate). After a suspension of the rules (House) and designation as an emergency bill (Senate), the bill was passed by the House on the fourth legislative day and by the Senate on the fifth by a wide majority of both houses (including many Republicans) and took effect December 18, 1907. The only opposition reported in the record of either chamber was from a Senator that objected "to the section permitting negro nurses and attendants riding in the coach or compartment designated for whites".

Party composition

Senate

House of Representatives

Leadership

Senate
With the Democratic caucus controlling the Oklahoma Senate, Henry S. Johnston of Perry, Oklahoma, was selected to serve as the first President pro tempore of the Oklahoma Senate. Johnston had served as the presiding officer of the state constitutional convention. Lieutenant Governor George W. Bellamy served as the President of the Senate, which gave him a tie-breaking vote and allowed him to serve as a presiding officer.

House
After much deliberation over who would serve as Speaker of the Oklahoma House of Representatives, the Democratic caucus chose William H. Murray of Tishomingo, Oklahoma, a former Chickasaw Nation representative and the president of the state constitutional convention. Sworn into office on November 16, 1907, Murray pushed for legislation to curb business excesses and support agriculture during his single term as speaker. State Representative A. H. Ellis, of Garfield County, Oklahoma, was elected by his peers to serve as speaker pro tempore.

Staff
Charles H. Pittman served as the first chief clerk of the Oklahoma House of Representatives.

Members

Senate

Table based on cross-references of three sources.

House of Representatives

Table based on government database.

References

External links
First State of the State Address
Oklahoma Legislature
Oklahoma House of Representatives
Oklahoma Senate

Oklahoma legislative sessions
1907 in Oklahoma
1908 in Oklahoma
1907 U.S. legislative sessions
1908 U.S. legislative sessions